David Laganella (born 1974) is an American composer based in Philadelphia. 

Raised in Haddonfield, New Jersey, Laganella graduated from Haddonfield Memorial High School in 1992, studied Guitar and Jazz at Berklee College of Music then pursued music composition degrees from New York University and the University of Pennsylvania, where he received his PhD in music composition at the age of 27. He has resided in Woodbury, New Jersey with his wife and their son.

His music has received awards from The American Society of Composers, Authors and Publishers (ASCAP), The Pennsylvania Council on the Arts, The American Composers Orchestra, The Meet the Composer Fund and The American Composers Forum.  He currently holds the position of Professor of Music and Department Chair at Wesley College, Delaware.

Laganella is the author of the book, The Composer's Guide to the Electric Guitar (Mel Bay) which is a guide for composers who want to use the instrument in their music.

References

External links
https://web.archive.org/web/20100617083415/http://music.wesley.edu/faculty.php
https://web.archive.org/web/20110722133246/http://www.chambermusicnow.org/laganella.html
http://www.americancomposers.org/rel20070413.htm
http://www.sequenza21.com/122203.html
http://www.concordiaplayers.org/Laganella.htm
https://web.archive.org/web/20070312001856/http://www.melbay.com/product.asp?ProductID=99943BCD

American male classical composers
Berklee College of Music alumni
Living people
20th-century classical composers
21st-century classical composers
1974 births
University of Pennsylvania alumni
20th-century American guitarists
21st-century American guitarists
Guitarists from Philadelphia
American male guitarists
20th-century American composers
New York University alumni
Classical musicians from Pennsylvania
20th-century American male musicians
21st-century American male musicians
Haddonfield Memorial High School alumni
Musicians from New Jersey
People from Haddonfield, New Jersey
People from Woodbury, New Jersey
Rowan University alumni